Levers Water is a small lake in the English Lake District. It is located at the head of the Coppermines Valley, above Coniston village. To its south-west is Raven Tor, a spur of Brim Fell, and to its north-west are Little How Crags and Great How Crags, on the eastern side of the north–south ridge leading to Swirl How.

A dam built in 1717 enlarged the existing tarn to provide water for the mines and for the village below.

A public footpath on its north-east side connects the Coppermines Valley to Swirl Hawse, while to its south-west, a path leads up Gill Cove to Levers Hawse on the main ridge of the Coniston Fells.

References

Lakes of the Lake District
South Lakeland District